The 6th Hong Kong Awards ceremony, honored the best films of 1986 and took place on 24 April 1987 at Hong Kong Baptist University, Academic Community Hall, Kowloon Tong, Hong Kong. The ceremony was hosted by Carol Cheng and Chung King-fai, during the ceremony awards are presented in 14 categories. The ceremony was sponsored by City Entertainment Magazine.

Awards
Winners are listed first, highlighted in boldface, and indicated with a double dagger.

References

External links
 Official website of the Hong Kong Film Awards

1987
1986 film awards
1987 in Hong Kong